Czesław Malec (26 June 1941 – 18 July 2018) was a Polish basketball player. He competed in the men's tournament at the 1968 Summer Olympics.

He died on 18 July 2018 aged 77.

Honours
Wisła Kraków
 Polish basketball championship (3): 1961–62, 1963–64, 1967–68
Poland
 EuroBasket third place: 1965, 1967

References

External links
 

1941 births
2018 deaths
People from Kremenets
Polish men's basketball players
1967 FIBA World Championship players
Olympic basketball players of Poland
Basketball players at the 1968 Summer Olympics